is a railway station on the South Hokkaido Railway Line in Hokuto, Hokkaido, Japan, operated by South Hokkaido Railway Company.

Lines

Adjacent stations

History
Kunebetsu Station on the Esashi Line opened on 15 September 1913. With the privatization of JNR on 1 April 1987, the station came under the control of JR Hokkaido.

Operations on the Esashi Line were transferred from JR Hokkaido to South Hokkaido Railway Company when the Hokkaido Shinkansen opened on 26 March 2016.

See also
 List of railway stations in Japan

References

Stations of Hokkaido Railway Company
Railway stations in Hokkaido Prefecture
Railway stations in Japan opened in 1913
Hokuto, Hokkaido